No Place is a drama-thriller film written, directed and independently produced by Cive Frayne and Steve O'Brien, who was also the Cinematographer. It was filmed in Northumberland,  North East of England.

Screenings were presented at the Tyneside Cinema, Cinéma Olympia - Cannes, One Aldwych - London

References

2005 films
2000s thriller films
2000s English-language films